Kangjei is a Meitei term meaning to hit (jei, derived from chei) a round object (kang). It may refer to:

Polo, also known as sagol kangjei
Khong kangjei, a type of field hockey indigenous to Manipur